M. digitata may refer to:
 Macrarene digitata, a sea snail, a marine gastropod mollusk in the family Liotiidae
 Merulempista digitata, a moth species found in China
 Montipora digitata, the finger coral, a stony coral species found in East Africa, the Indo-West Pacific, Kenya, Mozambique and Rodriguez

Synonyms 
 Monilia digitata or Mucor digitata, two synonyms for Penicillium digitatum, a plant pathogen

See also